The 2018 Road to the Kentucky Oaks was a points system by which Thoroughbred fillies qualified for the 2018 Kentucky Oaks, held on May 4. The races were held from September 2017 (when the fillies were age two) through April 2018 (when they turned three). The top four finishers in the specified races earned points, with the highest point values awarded in the major preparatory races held in late March or early April. Earnings in non-restricted stakes acted as a tie breaker.

Fillies who instead wished to enter the Kentucky Derby had to earn the necessary points in the races on the Road to the Kentucky Derby: points earned on the Road to the Kentucky Oaks were not transferable. However, if a filly did earn qualifying points for the Derby by racing in open company, those points also counted towards qualifying for the Oaks.

Changes from 2017
Churchill Downs announced the schedule for the 2018 Road to the Kentucky Oaks on August 31, 2017. The only changes from the 2017 season were:
 Race change: Suncoast Stakes added.
 Point system changes: Points for the Bourbonette Stakes reduced to 20-8-4-2.

The Delta Princess Stakes, which would have been the 31st race in the series, was cancelled in the aftermath of Hurricane Harvey.

Standings
The following table shows the points earned in the eligible races. Entries for the Kentucky Oaks were taken on April 30. The race was won by Monomoy Girl, who qualified by winning the Rachel Alexandra and Ashland Stakes.

 Winner of Kentucky Oaks in bold
 Entrants for Kentucky Oaks in pink
 Injured/Not nominated/Bypassing the race in gray

Race Results

Prep season

Championship Series

See also
2018 Road to the Kentucky Derby

Notes

References

Kentucky Oaks
Road to the Kentucky Oaks
Road to the Kentucky Oaks